Descendants of the Sun: The Philippine Adaptation is a 2020 Philippine television drama action series broadcast by GMA Network. The series is based on a 2016 South Korean television drama series of the same title. Directed by Dominic Zapata, it stars Dingdong Dantes and Jennylyn Mercado. It premiered on February 10, 2020 on the network's Telebabad line up replacing The Gift. The series concluded on December 25, 2020 with a total of 65 episodes.

The series is streaming online on YouTube.

Cast and characters

Lead cast
 Dingdong Dantes as Lucas Manalo
 Jennylyn Mercado as Maxine Dela Cruz

Supporting cast
 Rocco Nacino as Diego Ramos / Wolf
 Jasmine Curtis-Smith as Moira Defensor
 Andre Paras as Ralph Vergara
 Chariz Solomon as Emma Perez
 Renz Fernandez as Earl Jimeno
 Pancho Magno as Daniel Spencer
 Nicole Kim Donesa as Via Catindig
 Reese Tuazon as Sandra Delgado
 Jenzel Angeles as Hazel Flores
 Bobby Andrews as Eric Chavez
 Ricardo Cepeda as Carlos Defensor
 Paul Salas as Marty Talledo
 Lucho Ayala as Alen Eugenio / Snoopy
 Jon Lucas as Benjo Tamayo / Harry Potter
 Prince Clemente as Randy Katipunan / Picollo
 Antonio Aquitania as Bienvenido Garcia
 Neil Ryan Sese as Rodel Dela Cruz
 Ian Ignacio as Greg Abad
 Rich Asuncion as Janet Pagsisihan
 Carlo Gonzales as Val Domingo
 Roi Vinzon as Abraham Manalo
 Hailey Mendes as Judith Manalo
 Marina Benipayo as Olivia Dela Cruz

Guest cast
 Mike "Pekto" Nacua
 Tonton Gutierrez as General Cruz
 Sophie Albert as Liza Ayson
 Gabby Eigenmann as Ricardo Sintallan
 Andrew Schimmer as Jimmy
 Sue Prado as Sheila
 Kim Rodriguez as Denise
 Addy Raj as Alif Fayad
 Ronnie Henares as Ed
 Mark Herras as Orly
 Archie Adamos as Lito

Production
Principal photography commenced in July 2019. It was halted in March 2020 due to the enhanced community quarantine in Luzon caused by the COVID-19 pandemic. Filming was continued in September 2020. The series resumed its programming on November 5, 2020.

Ratings
According to AGB Nielsen Philippines' Nationwide Urban Television Audience Measurement People in Television Homes, the pilot episode of Descendants of the Sun earned a 10.5% rating.

Accolades

References

External links
 
 

2020 Philippine television series debuts
2020 Philippine television series endings
Filipino-language television shows
GMA Network drama series
Philippine action television series
Philippine military television series
Philippine romance television series
Philippine television series based on South Korean television series
Television productions suspended due to the COVID-19 pandemic
Television shows set in the Philippines